Harsiesis may refer to:

 Horus, the Egyptian god
 Harsiesis (genus), a genus of butterflies

See also
 Harsiese (disambiguation)